William Mills (19 March 1875 – 8 April 1962) was a New Zealand cricketer. He played first-class cricket for Auckland and Taranaki between 1894 and 1904.

On his first-class debut Mills took 6 for 35 and 6 for 55 for Taranaki against Fiji in the last match of Fiji's tour of New Zealand in 1894–95.

See also
 List of Auckland representative cricketers

References

External links
 

1875 births
1962 deaths
New Zealand cricketers
Auckland cricketers
Taranaki cricketers
Cricketers from Auckland